Carrollton Township is one of twenty townships in Carroll County, Missouri, USA.  As of the 2000 census, its population was 4,355.

Carrollton Township was established in 1872, and named after the community of Carrollton.

Geography
According to the USGS, it contains three cemeteries: Mount Zion, Saint Marys and Willis Chapel.

The stream of Cottonwood Branch runs through this township.

References

 USGS Geographic Names Information System (GNIS)

External links
 US-Counties.com
 City-Data.com

Townships in Carroll County, Missouri
Townships in Missouri